The Marquette Sports Law Review (formerly the Marquette Sports Law Journal) is a biannual law review edited and published by students at Marquette University Law School that addresses current issues in sports law. The journal is affiliated with the law school's National Sports Law Institute (NSLI).

Editorial board and staff
The journal is produced by a staff of student editors and members. Membership invitations are extended to students selected in a writing competition held each summer. Membership for one academic year is a requirement to earn the NSLI's Sports Law Certificate.

The annual Joseph E. O'Neill Prize is awarded for the best student commentary.

See also
 List of law journals

References

External links

American law journals
Marquette University
Biannual journals
Publications established in 1990
English-language journals